Fred Siguier (1909–1972) was a French physician known for his studies about systemic diseases.

See also
 Systemic disease

References

French internists
1909 births
1972 deaths